A tail number refers to an identification number painted on an aircraft, frequently on the tail.

Tail numbers can represent:

 An aircraft registration number (civil aviation)
 United States military aircraft serials 
 United Kingdom military aircraft serials

See also

 Vehicle Identification Number
 Hull number
 Pennant number
 Tail code, which is not a unique identifier
 Fin flash, also called Tail flash